Dalmellington was one of 32 electoral wards of East Ayrshire Council. Originally created in 1974, the ward was initially within Cumnock and Doon Valley District Council before the local government reforms in the 1990s. The ward elected one councillor using the first-past-the-post voting electoral system.

The ward was a Labour stronghold as the party successfully held the seat at every election after gaining it from the Social Democratic Party (SDP) in 1992 until it was abolished.

In 2007, the ward was abolished and replaced by the multi-member Doon Valley ward as council elections moved to a proportional voting system – the single transferable vote – following the implementation of the Local Governance (Scotland) Act 2004.

Boundaries
The Dalmellington ward was created in 1974 by the Formation Electoral Arrangements from the previous Dalmellington South electoral division of Ayr County Council. The ward centered around the town of Dalmellington and took in the southern part of Cumnock and Doon Valley next to its borders with Kyle and Carrick District Council and Stewartry District Council. The boundaries remained largely unchanged following the Initial Statutory Reviews of Electoral Arrangements in 1981. A review in 1986 into the boundaries between the Cumnock and Doon Valley and Kyle and Carrick district councils saw an area to the south of Dalmellington transferred from Kyle and Carrick to Cumnock and Doon Valley which extended the council area to the boundary with Wigtown District Council and included the whole of Loch Doon within Cumnock and Doon Valley. All of the area transferred was included within the Dalmellington ward. Following the Second Statutory Reviews of Electoral Arrangements in 1994, the ward's eastern boundary was moved west to reduce it in area as a result of the 1986 review. After the implementation of the Local Government etc. (Scotland) Act 1994, the boundaries proposed by the second review became the Formation Electoral Arrangements for the newly created East Ayrshire Council – an amalgamation of Cumnock and Doon Valley District Council and Kilmarnock and Loudoun District Council. In 1998, the Third Statutory Reviews of Electoral Arrangements made minor alterations to the wards northern boundary ahead of the 1999 election. In 2007, the ward was abolished as the Local Governance (Scotland) Act 2004 saw proportional representation and new multi-member wards introduced. The vast majority of the area covered by the Dalmellington ward was placed into the new Doon Valley ward and a small area became part of the Cumnock and New Cumnock ward.

Councillors

Election results

2003 election

1999 election

1995 election

1992 election

1988 election

1984 election

1980 election

1977 election

1974 election

References

Wards of East Ayrshire
Dalmellington